Germanvox–Wega was an Italian professional cycling team that existed from 1967 to 1970.

The team was selected to race in four editions of the Giro d'Italia, where they achieved two stage wins.

Major victories
1967
 Stage 16 (ITT) Giro d'Italia, Ole Ritter
 Stage 4 Tirreno–Adriatico, Bruno Vittiglio
1969
 Stage 17 Giro d'Italia, Ole Ritter
 Stage 5b (ITT) Giro di Sardegna, Ole Ritter
1970
 Vuelta a España
Points classification, Guido Reybrouck
Stages 4, 8 & 10, Guido Reybrouck
 Trofeo Matteotti, Ole Ritter
 Gran Premio di Lugano, Ole Ritter
 Stage 7 Paris–Nice, Guido Reybrouck
 Stage 2 Paris–Nice, Ole Ritter

References

Defunct cycling teams based in Italy
1967 establishments in Italy
1970 disestablishments in Italy
Cycling teams established in 1967
Cycling teams disestablished in 1970